Regionals may refer to:

Figure skating competition
NCAA basketball tournament
NCAA Division I Baseball Championship
"Journey" (Glee)